List of rivers flowing in the province of Jambi, Indonesia:

In alphabetical order

See also 
 List of rivers of Indonesia
 List of rivers of Sumatra

References

Sources
 W. van Gelder. Dari Tanah Hindia berkoeliling boemi: kitab pengadjaran ilmoe boemi bagi sekola anak negeri di Hindia-Nederland. J.B. Wolters, 1897.Original from National Library of the Netherlands (original from Leiden University Libraries). Digitized: Nov 5, 2017.
 Wetenschappelijke voordrachten gehouden te Amsterdam in 1883, ter gelegenheid der Koloniale Tentoonstelling. Amsterdam (Netherlands). Koloniale Tentoonstelling, 1883. Uitgegeven door de Vijfde Afdeeling van het Tentoonstellings-bestuur, E. J. Brill, 1884. Cornell University. Digitized: May 22, 2014.

External links 

 Colour relief map of Sumatra showing province borders and capital cities and main rivers.

 
Jambi